Group C of the 2014 Fed Cup Europe/Africa Zone Group I was one of four pools in the Europe/Africa zone of the 2014 Fed Cup. Four teams competed in a round robin competition, with the top team and the bottom team proceeding to their respective sections of the play-offs: the top team played for advancement to the World Group II Play-offs, while the bottom team faced potential relegation to Group II.

Standings

Round-robin

Ukraine vs. Israel

Austria vs. Slovenia

Ukraine vs. Slovenia

Austria vs. Israel

Ukraine vs. Austria

Slovenia vs. Israel

See also 
 Fed Cup structure

References

External links 
 Fed Cup website

C1